Nicolas Lopez may refer to:

 Nicolás Lindley López (1908–1995), Peruvian military commander 
 Nicolas Lopez (fencer) (born 1980), French sabre fencer
 Nicolás López (director) (born 1983), Chilean film director
 Nicolás López (footballer, born 1986), Uruguayan footballer
 Nicolás López Macri (born 1990), Argentine footballer
 Nicolás López (footballer, born 1993), Uruguayan footballer
 Nicolas Lopez (Bahamian footballer) (born 2003), Bahamian footballer

See also
 Nicola López (born 1975), American artist